The 1997 Brown Bears football team was an American football team that represented Brown University during the 1997 NCAA Division I-AA football season. Brown tied for third in the Ivy League. 

In their fourth and final season under head coach Mark Whipple, the Bears compiled a 4–3 record and outscored opponents 274 to 194. J. Karcutskie and D. McClutchy were the team captains. 

The Bears' 4–3 conference record tied for third place in the Ivy League standings. They outscored Ivy opponents 171 to 138. 

Brown played its home games at Brown Stadium in Providence, Rhode Island.

Schedule

Note

References

Brown
Brown Bears football seasons
Brown Bears football